Sampson Starkweather is an American poet. Starkweather received a BA in English Roanoke College and an MFA in creative writing from Sarah Lawrence College. In 2006, Sampson Starkweather started the press Birds, LLC. with Dan Boehl, Chris Tonelli, Matt Rasmussen, and Justin Marks. He has helped organize, Lost & Found: The CUNY Poetics Document Initiative and the CUNY Chapbook festival. In 2013, Starkweather self-published The First Four Books of Sampson Starkweather through Birds, LLC. The book has been categorized as a ‘metarealist’ text by the Huffington Post.

Publications
The First Four Books of Sampson Starkweather. (2013). Austin, TX; Minneapolis, MN; New York City, NY; Raleigh, NC.: Birds, LLC. 

Chapbooks
Like Clouds Never Render (2012). Providence, RI: O’clock Press.
The Heart is Green from So Much Waiting (2010). Brooklyn, NY: Immaculate Disciples Press.
The photograph (2007). Denver, Colo: Horse Less Press. 
City of Moths (2008). Boston: Rope-a-Dope Press. 
Self Help Poems.

References

External links
Sampson Starkweather reads Flowers of Rad for The Continental Review.  
Sampson Starkwewather reads the video poem, Federal Bureau of Investigation. 
Reading from The First 4 Books of Sampson Starkweather at The Center for Book Arts.
Interview with Mike Young at HTMLGIANT as part of STARK WEEK @ HTMLGIANT. Complete Digital Archive of STARK WEEK.
Octopus Magazine Review of The First Four Books of Sampson Starkweather.

21st-century American poets
1976 births
Living people